Alan Eduardo "Lalo" Torres Villanueva (born 19 February 2000) is a Mexican professional footballer who plays as a defensive midfielder for Liga MX club Guadalajara.

International career
In April 2019, Torres was included in the 21-player squad to represent Mexico at the U-20 World Cup in Poland.

Career statistics

Club

References

External links
Alan Torres at Soccerway
Alan Torres At Debut Guadalajara (in Spanish)

2000 births
Living people
Mexican footballers
Mexico youth international footballers
Association football midfielders
C.D. Guadalajara footballers
Liga Premier de México players
Tercera División de México players
Mexico under-20 international footballers